Arkansas Highway 40 may refer to:
Arkansas Highway 40 (1926-1958), now numbered 140
Interstate 40 in Arkansas, created in the late 1950s